Acianthera gracilisepala is a species of orchid.

gracilisepala